Heterocampa astarte, the astarte prominent moth, is a species of moth in the family Notodontidae (the prominents). It was first described by Edward Doubleday in 1841 and it is found in North America.

The MONA or Hodges number for Heterocampa astarte is 7977.

References

Further reading

External links

 

Notodontidae
Articles created by Qbugbot
Moths described in 1841